Reynoldson is a surname. Notable people with the surname include:

George Reynoldson (1856–1947), Australian politician
Kirk Reynoldson (born 1979), Australian professional rugby league footballer
Nick Reynoldson, Canadian stand-up comedian
Steve Reynoldson (born 1962), Australian rules footballer 
W. Ward Reynoldson (1920–2016), American lawyer and judge